Botten is both a surname and a given name. Notable people with the name include:

Else-May Botten (born 1973), Norwegian politician
Jackie Botten (1938–2006), South African cricketer
Botten Soot (1895–1958), Norwegian actress, singer and dancer

See also
Paul Botten-Hansen (1824–1869), Norwegian librarian, book collector, magazine editor and literary critic
Botten Cabin, a historic building in Washington, United States
Bottens, a municipality of Vaud, Switzerland